Sofia Polcanova (born 3 September 1994 in Chișinău) is a Moldovan-Austrian table tennis player. She competed at the 2016 Summer Olympics in the women's singles event, in which she was eliminated in the second round by Jian Fang Lay, and as part of the Austrian team in the women's team event. In 2021, she competed in the 2020 Olympics.

References

1994 births
Living people
Austrian female table tennis players
Moldovan table tennis players
Female table tennis players
Olympic table tennis players of Austria
Table tennis players at the 2016 Summer Olympics
Sportspeople from Chișinău
Moldovan emigrants to Austria
Austrian expatriate sportspeople
Moldovan expatriate sportspeople
Naturalised citizens of Austria
Table tennis players at the 2015 European Games
Table tennis players at the 2019 European Games
European Games competitors for Austria
Kinoshita Abyell Kanagawa players
Naturalised table tennis players
Expatriate table tennis people in Japan
Table tennis players at the 2020 Summer Olympics